The Rampage, initially named MARS (Multi-purpose, Air-launched Rocket System), is an air-to-surface missile developed by Israel Military Industries derived from the EXTRA. It is a standoff weapon designed to hit high-value targets such as radar installations, communications centers, weapons storage facilities and airfields while the launch aircraft remains out of range of air defenses. It was officially unveiled in June 2018 and reportedly used for the first time in April 2019 in Syria.

See also 
SkySniper

References

External links
Rampage Long Range Air-to-Ground Precise Strike Weapon. Israel Aerospace Industries
Rampage Long-range precise air-to-ground supersonic missile. Elbit Systems

Rocket weapons
Air-to-surface missiles
Guided missiles of Israel